The 40th Hong Kong Film Awards presentation ceremony took place at The Star Hall at Kowloonbay International Trade & Exhibition Centre (KITEC) on 17 July 2022. Earlier it was scheduled for April 17 but it was postponed thrice due to COVID-19. Nominations announced on 16 February 2022, include films released theatrically both in 2020 and 2021, as the 2021 edition was cancelled due to the COVID-19 pandemic.

Raging Fire won the best film award, whereas its director Benny Chan, who died in 2020 and won the best director award at the ceremony. Anita, a biopic on Cantopop star Anita Mui won most awards, followed by Limbo and Raging Fire.

Winners and nominees 
 Nominations

Winners are listed first, highlighted in boldface, and indicated with a double dagger .

Films that received multiple nominations

Films that received multiple awards

References

External links
 
 "The 40th Hong Kong Film Awards - Rules and Regulations"

2022 film awards
2022 in Hong Kong
2022
Hong
Events postponed due to the COVID-19 pandemic
Impact of the COVID-19 pandemic on cinema